"192" (in Macedonian read as: Еден, девет, двa) is a song by the Macedonian singer and song-writer Elena Risteska from her second album with the same name. 192 is the three-digit telephone number for the police in North Macedonia. In 2008 Serbian version of the song was realized under the title 92. The Serbian version is included in Milioner.

References

2007 songs
Macedonian songs
Songs written by Darko Dimitrov